Gordiy Semionovich Sablukov (1804–1880) was a Russian expert on Islam.

With Dimitriy Boguslavsky he was responsible for the first Russian translation of the Koran from Arabic into Russian.

References

Bibliography

1804 births
1880 deaths
Translators of the Quran into Russian
Russian Arabists
Historians of Islam
Russian orientalists
Historians from the Russian Empire
Male writers from the Russian Empire
19th-century translators
19th-century male writers from the Russian Empire